Žan Kolmanič (born 3 March 2000) is a Slovenian professional footballer who plays as a left-back for Major League Soccer club Austin FC.

Career
In March 2021, Kolmanič joined Major League Soccer expansion club Austin FC on loan ahead of the 2021 season. He made 30 league appearances during his first season, and the club exercised their loan option in November 2021, acquiring Kolmanič on a permanent deal through 2024.

Career statistics

Honours
Maribor
Slovenian PrvaLiga: 2018–19
Slovenian Cup runner-up: 2018–19

References

External links
Žan Kolmanič at NZS 

2000 births
Living people
People from Murska Sobota
Slovenian footballers
Slovenian expatriate footballers
Association football fullbacks
Slovenia youth international footballers
Slovenia under-21 international footballers
Slovenian PrvaLiga players
Major League Soccer players
NK Maribor players
Austin FC players
Slovenian expatriate sportspeople in the United States
Expatriate soccer players in the United States